Wythenshawe Park is located in Northern moor & borders into baguley  England, covers an area of 270 acres. Wythenshawe Hall lies at its centre.

The park features woodland, bedding, grassland and meadows, sporting facilities, Wythenshawe community farm and a horticulture centre.

History

The land now bounded by Wythenshawe Park was originally demesne land belonging to the wealthy Tatton family, from at least 1297 onwards. According to documents from the 13th century, the land was enclosed as a deer park for the purpose of hunting.

There is no evidence of any manor house until the 16th century, when Robert Tatton of Chester built a new family home here around 1540. Wythenshawe (or Withenshawe) Hall was built as a timber-framed Tudor house, possibly surrounded originally by a moat. It became the home of the Tatton Family for almost 400 years.

In 1641, Robert Tatton of Chester's descendant, also named Robert Tatton, commissioned a survey of the estate from a Richard Martinscroft, who prepared a map of the tenanted and demesne lands.

Soon after, Wythenshawe Hall was caught up in the hostilities of the English Civil War. Robert Tatton was a Royalist, and in the winter of 1643–44 the house was besieged by Parliamentarian forces and seized. After the Restoration of the monarchy, Wythenshawe Hall was returned to the Tatton Family.

The first evidence of landscaping in the grounds date to the 1641 estate map. Further landscaping was added in about 1830, replacing fields.

The structures of a farm that was located west of Wythenshawe Hall have survived as park maintenance buildings. North Lodge, a Grade II-listed gate lodge at the northern entrance to the park was built in the Tudor style in the mid to late 19th century.

The Wythenshawe estate remained in the Tatton family possession until 1926 when the Hall and 250 acres of the estate were purchased by Sir Ernest Simon and his wife Shena Simon. They presented Wythenshawe Park and the Hall to the Manchester Corporation "to be kept forever as an open space for the people of Manchester". At this time the Corporation was developing Wythenshawe as a new garden suburb of Manchester to provide housing for families who were moved out of the city to allow slum clearance, and Wythenshawe Park was set aside to provide a recreational green space for the new Wythenshawe housing estate.

In 1968, a -tall bronze statue of Oliver Cromwell on a granite plinth and pedestal was relocated to Wythenshawe Park. Sculpted by Matthew Noble, it had originally stood on Deansgate in Manchester city centre. From its inception, the statue had proved politically controversial, advocated by Radical Liberals but denounced by conservatives. Eventually its location was found to be obstructing traffic, and the statue was re-sited to Wythenshawe Park, commemorating Wythenshawe Hall's association with the Civil War. Within weeks, the statue was vandalised with paint and Cromwell's sword was stolen. The statue was listed Grade II in 1994 by English Heritage.

In 2016, Wythenshawe Hall was severely damaged by fire during an arson attack. The structure is currently undergoing restoration work and is closed to the public.

Facilities
Wythenshawe Park has a range of leisure, sporting and educational facilities open to the public, including an athletics track, café, a baseball field, football pitches, a pavilion, an orienteering course, horse riding facilities and tennis courts. It is also home to a horticultural centre and the Wythenshawe community farm, which  has been set up to educate urban children about food production in a working farm setting.

See also
Wythenshawe Park Metrolink station

References 

Parks and commons in Manchester
Wythenshawe